Juan ("Juantxo") de Dios García-Mauriño Sanchís (born 11 March 1964 in Barcelona) is a former field hockey player from Spain. He won the silver medal with the men's national team at the 1996 Summer Olympics in Atlanta, Georgia.

He is an architect and accomplished writer that has published a series of articles in local journals about sports that provide a glimpse behind the scenes with a particular sense of humour.

References
Spanish Olympic Committee

External links
 

1964 births
Living people
Spanish male field hockey players
Olympic field hockey players of Spain
Field hockey players at the 1988 Summer Olympics
Field hockey players at the 1992 Summer Olympics
Field hockey players at the 1996 Summer Olympics
Field hockey players from Barcelona
Olympic medalists in field hockey
Medalists at the 1996 Summer Olympics
Olympic silver medalists for Spain